Combat of Giants is a series of video games published by Ubisoft, exclusively for Nintendo systems. It was called Battle of Giants in North America until 2011 when Combat of Giants: Dinosaurs 3D was released using the original name.

Games

Combat of Giants: Dinosaurs
Combat of Giants: Dinosaurs, known as Battle of Giants: Dinosaurs in North America, is a video game in the Combat of Giants series developed by Ubisoft Quebec and published by Ubisoft for the Nintendo DS. It was released on October 14, 2008 in North America, and October 30, 2008 in PAL territories.  The basic gameplay uses the touchscreen to allow the player to control one of 26 species of dinosaur. The dinosaurs are divided into the following six classes, each with a bonus in one of three statistical areas.  Ravenous predators and vicious predators receive an attack bonus, witty scavengers and horned territorials receive a speed bonus and long necks and mighty tanks receive a defense bonus. The player chooses the dinosaur's name, species and color at the beginning. They can change its color in the grotto. They use the stylus to move and ward of other dinosaurs in level 2 and above. The player must collect 4 fossils and 100 eggs to progress to the next level. They earn eggs by defeating other dinosaurs and earn fossils by tapping dirt with the stylus. The game also features modern day machinery, which are playable in the Quick Match mode after being beaten.

Combat of Giants: Dragons
Combat of Giants: Dragons, known as Battle of Giants: Dragons in North America, is a video game in the Combat of Giants series developed by Ubisoft Quebec and published by Ubisoft for the Nintendo DS. It was released on September 29, 2009 in North America and on October 2, 2009 in Europe. In the game, an extensive war between dragons and humans caused the Lord of all the Dragons, Ninnurtu, to gather the noble Ebebu dragons and the foul Salmu dragons and combine their powers to create Tammabuku, their own world in which they could have peace. However, the Salmu dragons stole the gems of the Ebebu dragons which were the power source of all the dragons and Ninnurtu was left powerless from creating the world. The player, the last Ebebu dragons, has to win back all of the gems stolen by the Salmu dragons and continue Ninnurtu's legacy as the Lord of all the Dragons.

The gameplay is divided into two parts: Exploration and Gameplay. Exploration mode allows the Player to freely roam in an area to complete objectives, unlock certain areas, and fight Salmu dragons. When the Player gets too close to an opponent dragon, the Combat mode is triggered. Combat mode is a turn-based fight where the Player can either attack, block or dodge to gain Dirga necessary to use Special Attacks from the gems. Each copy of the game comes with a booster pack containing cards. There are "dragon" cards and "gem" cards. The dragons are based on the dragons that you fight within the game in terms of appearance and names. The gem cards have 15-character codes that can be entered into the game to acquire powerful Gold gems.

Combat of Giants: Dragons Bronze Edition
Combat of Giants: Dragons Bronze Edition, known as Battle of Giants: Dragons Bronze Edition in North America, is a video game in the Battle of Giants series developed by Ubisoft Quebec and published by Ubisoft for the Nintendo DSi as a DSiWare game. It was released on November 2, 2009 in North America and on October 23, 2009 in Europe. The gameplay is similar to Combat of Giants: Dragons, as Bronze Edition is a cut-down version of that game. This version of the game allows you to play as the Bronze Dragon as far as differences between the two games are concerned.

Combat of Giants: Mutant Insects
Combat of Giants: Mutant Insects, known as Battle of Giants: Mutant Insects in North America, is a video game in the Battle of Giants series developed by Ubisoft Quebec and published by Ubisoft on March 2, 2010 for the Nintendo DS. The player must fight through a world of insects to overthrow the queen. Like the other Battle of Giants games, you can customize your character's color and certain traits.

Combat of Giants: Dinosaurs Fight for Survival
Combat of Giants: Dinosaurs Fight for Survival, known as Battle of Giants: Dinosaurs Fight for Survival in North America, is a video game in the Battle of Giants series developed by Ubisoft Quebec and published by Ubisoft for the Nintendo DSi as a DSiWare game. It was published on March 15, 2010 in North America and on April 16, 2010 in Europe. The basic gameplay uses the touchscreen to allow the player to fight as a dinosaur. The game is a cut-down version of the original Combat of Giants: Dinosaurs.

Combat of Giants: Mutant Insects Revenge
Combat of Giants: Mutant Insects Revenge, known as Battle of Giants: Mutant Insects Revenge in North America, is a video game in the Battle of Giants series developed by Ubisoft Quebec and published by Ubisoft for the Nintendo DSi as a DSiWare game. It was published on June 28, 2010 in North America and on June 18, 2010 in Europe. The gameplay is similar to Combat of Giants: Mutant Insects, and is a direct sequel to that game.

Combat of Giants: Dinosaur Strike
Combat of Giants: Dinosaur Strike, also known as Battle of Giants: Dinosaur Strike in North America, is a video game developed by Ubisoft, released for the Wii on November 2, 2010.

Set 150 million years ago (though including species from throughout the Mesozoic), players can control dinosaurs fighting over territory, who have two main attacks, light and heavy. The player also is able to use Wii Remote and Nunchuk gestures to perform combo attacks and special moves known as "Strikes". Players can choose from 28 different dinosaur genera, some initially available, others unlockable through certain game modes, and the rest unlockable by special codes. The game features 12 initially available dinosaur species, with an additional six available through the single player "Domination" mode. By using special codes, the player can unlock a variety of alternative skinned dinosaurs (called "Neo" Dinosaurs) and six new types, as well as several super-powerful fictional types excluding Archosaurus.

Combat of Giants: Dinosaurs 3D

Combat of Giants: Dinosaurs 3D is a video game developed by Ubisoft, released for the Nintendo 3DS on February 26, 2011 in Japan, March 27, 2011 in North America, and March 31, 2011 in Europe. In the game, players control various dinosaurs and fight hostile dinosaurs to progress through levels and ultimately battle the game's final boss, the Arkosaurus.

References

External links
www.combatofgiants.com

Video game franchises
Dinosaurs in video games
Video games about dragons
Kaiju video games
2008 video games
Ubisoft franchises
Ubisoft games
Role-playing video games
Adventure games
3D fighting games
Video games about insects
Video games developed in Canada
Nintendo DS games
Nintendo DS-only games
DSiWare games
Wii games
Wii-only games